A barnyard is a barn adjoining a yard, farmyard in British English.

Barnyard may also refer to:
 Barnyard millet
 Barnyard (film), a 2006 animated film
 Barnyard (video game), a 2006 game based on the film
 The Barnyard, a 1923 film featuring Oliver Hardy
 The Barnyard, University of Minnesota's basketball student section
 Barnyards, Highland in Inverness-shire, Scottish Highlands 
 Barnyard Builders, A show about saving aging and possibly decrepit log structures.